The Worker's Way is an Iranian Marxist-Leninist political organisation formed in 1978, by former affiliates of other leftist groups. It is currently exiled in Germany.

This Organization firstly established with the name Worker’s Way in 1979, but in 1982 changed its name to Organization of Revolutionary Workers of Iran – The Worker’s Way (O.R.W.I). However, it has once again used its previous name, Worker’s Way since 2008, because of the occurrence of a split in the organization in 2008 and separation of a group of members who called themselves the Executive Board of the Revolutionary Workers Organization of Iran (Rāh-e Kārgar).

The organization was critical of other leftist groups, including Tudeh Party, factions of People's Fedai Guerrillas and Peykar. However, it did not have a broad power base like its leftist rivals.

It considered the post-revolution establishment a "fascist" regime, while respecting the clergy for its ability to mobilize the masses. In 1981, some of leading members were executed, including ʿAlī-Reżā Šokūhī, Ḥosayn Qāżī, and Mahdī Ḵosrowšāhī.

References

External links

Banned communist parties
Banned political parties in Iran
Communist parties in Iran
Militant opposition to the Islamic Republic of Iran
Organisations of the Iranian Revolution